In computational complexity theory, polynomial creativity is a theory analogous to the theory of creative sets in recursion theory and mathematical logic. The  are a family of formal languages in the complexity class NP whose complements certifiably do not have  nondeterministic recognition algorithms. It is generally believed that NP is unequal to co-NP (the class of complements of languages in NP), which would imply more strongly that the complements of all NP-complete languages do not have polynomial-time nondeterministic recognition algorithms. However, for the  sets, the lack of a (more restricted) recognition algorithm can be proven, whereas a proof that  remains elusive.

The  sets are conjectured to form counterexamples to the Berman–Hartmanis conjecture on isomorphism of NP-complete sets. It is NP-complete to test whether an input string belongs to any one of these languages, but no polynomial time isomorphisms between all such languages and other NP-complete languages are known. Polynomial creativity and the  sets were introduced in 1985 by Deborah Joseph and Paul Young, following earlier attempts to define polynomial analogues for creative sets by Ko and

Definition
Intuitively, a set is creative when there is a polynomial-time algorithm that creates a counterexample for any candidate fast nondeterministic recognition algorithm for its complement.

The classes of fast nondeterministic recognition algorithms are formalized by Joseph and Young as the sets   of nondeterministic Turing machine programs  that, for inputs  that they accept, have an accepting path with a number of steps that is at most  This notation should be distinguished with that for the complexity class NP. The complexity class NP is a set of formal languages, while  is instead a set of programs that accept some of these languages. Every language in NP is recognized by a program in one of the sets  with a parameter  that is (up to the factor  in the bound on the number of steps) the exponent in the polynomial running time of the 

More formally, there should exist a polynomially computable function  that maps programs in this class to inputs on which they fail. When given a 

Existence
Joseph and Young define a polynomial-time function  to be polynomially honest if its running time is at most a polynomial function of its output length. This disallows, for instance, functions that take polynomial time but produce outputs of less than polynomial length. As they show, every one-to-one polynomially-honest function  is the productive function for a  

 Joseph and Young define  to be the set of values  for nondeterministic programs  that have an accepting path for  using at most  steps. This number of steps (on that input) would be consistent with  belonging  Then  belongs to NP, for given an input  one can nondeterministically guess both  and its accepting path, and then verify that the input equals  and that the path is valid 

Completeness
Every  set with a polynomially honest productive function is NP-complete. For any other language  in NP, by the definition of NP, one can translate any input  for  into a nondeterministic program  that ignores its own input and instead searches for a witness  accepting its input if it finds one and rejecting otherwise. This composition maps inputs that belong to  into strings that belong  and inputs that do not belong to  into strings that do not belong  Thus, it is a polynomial-time many-one reduction from   Since  is (by definition) in NP, and every other language in NP has a reduction to it, it must be 

It is also possible to prove more strongly that there exists an invertible parsimonious reduction to the

Application to the Berman–Hartmanis conjecture
The Berman–Hartmanis conjecture states that there exists a polynomial-time isomorphism between any two NP-complete sets: a function that maps yes-instances of one such set one-to-one into yes-instances of the other, takes polynomial time, and whose inverse function can also be computed in polynomial time. It was formulated by Leonard C. Berman and Juris Hartmanis in 1977, based on the observation that all NP-complete sets known at that time were isomorphic.
An equivalent formulation of the conjecture is that every NP-complete set is paddable. This means that there exists a polynomial-time and polynomial-time-invertible one-to-one transformation  from yes-instances  to larger yes-instances that encode the "irrelevant" 

However, it is unknown how to find such a padding transformation for a  language whose productive function is not polynomial-time-invertible. Therefore, if one-way permutations exist, the  languages having these permutations as their productive functions provide candidate counterexamples to the Berman–Hartmanis 

The (unproven) Joseph–Young conjecture formalizes this reasoning. The conjecture states that there exists a one-way length-increasing function  such that  is not paddable.
There exists an oracle relative to which one-way functions exist, both of these conjectures are false, and the Berman–Hartmanis conjecture is

References

Structural complexity theory